Home Bargains is a British variety store chain founded in 1976 by Tom Morris in Liverpool, England, as Home and Bargain. It is the trading name of TJ Morris Ltd.

History
The retailer was founded by owner Tom Morris in 1976 as a single store called Home and Bargain in Old Swan, Liverpool when he was aged 21. The name was changed to Home Bargains in 1995, but is still colloquially referred to by its original name in the Merseyside area.

Morris, who was reported to have still owned an 89% stake in the business as of 2013, operates the company with his brother Joe. The business has since grown to become one of the largest privately owned companies within the United Kingdom, selling a variety of household items including food, clothing and games.

Customer numbers were estimated to be in excess of three million in February 2013, with items sold typically consisting of 70% regular lines and the rest as one-off product lines. The retailer was ranked sixth in a Which? list of 100 Top Stores, making them the highest ranking retailer within the United Kingdom.

Growth
From 1977, annual growth was around 20–25%. They opened their first warehouse in Prescot in 1979. They then moved to the Rocket Warehouse in 1983. Then, in 1994, they moved to another warehouse, Fallows Way. The retailer gained approval in January 2008 to construct new headquarters in Merseyside, which it estimated would create seven hundred jobs at the Axis business park, Croxteth, as it constructed a ten-storey distribution centre and retail training facility.

A £70m distribution centre began construction in October 2013 in Wiltshire, England, as a duplicate of their  facility that they had opened at its Liverpool headquarters some years prior, in order that their expansion plans could be maintained.

In January 2023, Home Bargains announced that the company had purchased rival discount retailer Quality Save for an undisclosed amount. The purchase came after Quality Save reported it had made a loss of more than £64,000 for the 12 months, compared to a prior £1.3m profit the year before despite having an increase of £3.7 million turnover.

Business operations

Sales strategies 
The strap line of the retailer is "Top Brands, Bottom Prices", with operations director Joe Morris explaining their business model of acquiring stock at the same cost price as the larger supermarkets, but selling them to the public at a cheaper price.

In August 2011, Home Bargains opened a website to enable customers to shop with them online.

Stores and branding 

Home Bargains stores have red and blue branding. Most are centrally located though several are in out of town retail parks. Stores range from small to medium outlets, with the retail park outlets being slightly larger.

In January 2009, the retailer acquired fourteen former Woolworths Group stores from the failed chain Woolworths Group. These stores include Cardiff and Port Talbot in Wales. In Fife, Scotland, two former Woolworths stores have been opened in shopping centres in Glenrothes and Kirkcaldy.

Corporate affairs

National expansion 
The retailer had aspirations to expand in countries outside of England and Wales in 2007, though owner Tom Morris was keen to ensure such expansion was controlled to avoid the risk of over expansion. The retailer announced in October 2008 that preparations are underway to expand into Scotland for the first time, opening their first store in Rutherglen in December 2008.

By March 2009, the company aimed to have six stores within the area of Glasgow, employing more than two hundred people. In February 2010, the company's £25 million Northern Ireland expansion plan was announced, with plans to have opened up to twenty five stores by 2015, to add to their then portfolio of 190 stores.

Financial performance
The retailer has seen strong sales growth over the past few years, with turnover more than doubling in a four-year period (2011 to 2015).

In 2009, the firm was aiming to be turning over £1bn a year by 2015, having grown the number of its stores to 350, with the potential for six hundred across the United Kingdom. Their turnover exceeded the £1billion mark in 2013, two years earlier than initially anticipated. The retailer aims to reach the £2billion annual turnover mark by 2020.

Affiliates
Home Bargains is also the supplier of similar discount chain Quality Save, whom it supplies all stock, shop fittings, trolleys and tills.

Sporting ventures
From April 2013 until January 2016, Home Bargains were kit sponsors of National League side Tranmere Rovers in a "six figure" deal, replacing long-term sponsors Wirral Council. The sponsorship ended when Rovers signed a three-year sponsorship deal with B&M Waste Services. Since October 2019, they have been the kit sponsors of League One side Bolton Wanderers. In 2021, Home Bargains signed a three year principal shirt partner deal with Super League club St Helens Rugby League Football Club for the 2022-2024 seasons.

Litigation
The retailer was fined over £20,000 in February 2017, after being caught selling phone chargers that risked exploding. The chargers had been imported from China yet had not undergone sufficient safety checks by the retailer, despite Trading Standards having carried out five failed safety checks on the product.

Despite being able to produce a Chinese test certificate indicating that a sample product was safety compliant, Home Bargains subsequentially admitted to three offences of electrical safety through the sale of unsafe chargers during 2015.

References

External links

 

Companies based in Liverpool
Retail companies established in 1976
Retail companies of the United Kingdom
Variety stores
Discount shops of the United Kingdom
1976 establishments in England
British companies established in 1976